EN 15227 is a European standard about the crashworthiness requirements for railway vehicle bodies. It was first resolved in 2008 and it is binding since 2012 for all new vehicles in the European Union.

The required energy absorption modules had major impacts on the headshape design of locomotives and passenger rolling stock. The specification is accompanied by EN 12663 (Structural requirements of railway vehicle bodies) that was updated in 2008 to meet the EN 15227 scenarios.

Scenarios 
The main definitions of EN 15277 look at a number of crash scenarios:

 head impact of similar vehicles at a speed of 
 impact on a lorry at a grade crossing at a speed of 
 impact on a smaller object like a car at a grade crossing.

For each scenario and train class there are minimum requirements on the remaining space in the driver cabin after the crash. Due to the expensive equipment there are no full body crash tests in railway applications. Instead the impact is simulated with finite element analysis and parts of the structure are validated by a real crash test (simulation and test result may not differ more than ten percent).

Result 
Before the time of EN 15277 the head of a locomotive was simply part of the full body of the railway vehicle. This has been replaced by a separately designed cabin that is subsequently integrated with the rest of the vehicle body. The area around the couplers is very different with the required anti-climbing protection buffers and the energy-absorption elements behind them. The rest of the headshape may come in very different designs as they are commonly made from fiberglass or carbon fiber.

Gallery

Regulations 
The EN 15227 has been made mandatory by the Technical Specifications for Interoperability (TSI) decisions in 2008 - the 2008/232/CE for high-speed railway and 2008/57/EC for conventional rail. While ongoing projects were allowed to be completed all new procurements had to include the requirement since then.

The comparable standards in the United States are 49CFR238 from the FRA and S-C&S-034-99 from the APTA. In an initial assessment the European standard was considered to be not equivalent and compliance with one standard would not imply compliance with the other standard. However, the required "Crash Energy Management System" of US-origin can be integrated into the EN 15227 cabin resulting in a vehicle that can be shown to be compliant in both areas.

See also 
 Crashworthiness
 Telescoping (rail cars)

References 

Transport and the European Union